Chironius exoletus is a species of snake of the family Colubridae. It is commonly known as Linnaeus' Sipo.

Geographic range
The snake is found in South America and Central America.

References 

Reptiles described in 1758
Taxa named by Carl Linnaeus
Reptiles of Bolivia
Reptiles of Brazil
Reptiles of Colombia
Reptiles of Ecuador
Reptiles of French Guiana
Reptiles of Guyana
Reptiles of Peru
Reptiles of Venezuela
exoletus
Snakes of South America
Snakes of Central America